An abandoned mine is a mine or quarry which is no longer producing or operational and which has no responsible party to finance the cost of addressing remediation and/or restoration of the mine feature/site. The term incorporates all types of old mines, including underground shaft mines and drift mines, and surface mines, including quarries and placer mining. Typically, the cost of addressing the mine's hazards is borne by the public/taxpayers/the government.

An abandoned mine may be a hazard to health, safety or environment.

Hazards 

Abandoned mines contain many hazards, including:

 Subsidence, or collapsing ground
 Blasting caps and other unexploded explosives
 Blackdamp, which accumulates in old mines and can cause suffocation
 Hidden mine shafts, often hidden beneath bushes, grasses, and other vegetation that has grown up around the mine entrance
 Unstable roofs and passageways, which are prone to cave-ins

Abandoned Mines in the United States

Definitions 

Department of the Interior - Bureau of Land Management - Abandoned mines are those mines that were abandoned before January 1, 1981, the effective date of the Bureau of Land Management's Surface Management regulations issued under the authority of the Federal Land Policy and Management Act of 1976, as amended (43 U.S.C. 1701 et seq.)
 Environmental Protection Agency - Abandoned mine lands (AMLs) are those lands, waters, and surrounding watersheds where extraction, beneficiation or, processing of ores and minerals has occurred.

In the United States, there are thousands of abandoned mines. The precise number of abandoned mines in the United States remains unknown, ranging "from the National Park Service's tally of 2,500 on its lands to the Mineral Policy Center's assessment of 560,000 abandoned mines on public and privately owned lands." Many of these abandoned mines are associated with abandoned neighboring towns often referred to as ghost towns.  Experts strongly warn against entering or exploring old or abandoned mines. In California, Nevada, Colorado, New Mexico, and Arkansas, there are over 6,500 abandoned mines, according to infographic. 

In the U.S., the estimation is that approximately 80% of the abandoned mine lands (AML) sites pose physical safety hazards and require more work in determining the proper safety of these lands.

Every year, dozens are injured or killed in recreational accidents on mine property. The majority of the deaths are unrelated to mine exploration, however. Drownings in open quarries and ATV accidents on abandoned mine properties are the leading cause of accidental death. The U.S. Department of Labor notes that since 1999, "more than 200 people have died in recreational accidents at the surface and underground active and abandoned operations across the country." Due to these circumstances, the Mine Safety and Health Administration launched the "Stay Out – Stay Alive" campaign, which is a national public awareness campaign aimed at warning and educating children and adults about the dangers of exploring and playing on active and abandoned mine sites.

In the U.S., the Abandoned Mine Land Initiative, launched by the Western Governor's Association and the National Mining Association is also an effort focusing on reporting the number of high-priority AML sites.  The initiative identifies, measures, and reports on the progress of current reclamation cleanup programs on an annual basis. In the Americas region, the United Nations Environment Programme (UNEP) and the Chilean Copper Commission (COHILCO) co-hosted a workshop to address the problem of abandoned or "orphaned" mines.  Including a representative from the UN, ten countries were represented from North, Central, and South America with an eleventh participant being Japan.

Legislation

Surface Mining Control and Reclamation Act (SMCRA) 
It can be hazardous and detrimental to reside close to an abandoned coal mining site. The Surface Mining Control and Reclamation Act were passed in 1977 in two parts; one to control the effects of active mines, and one to regulate abandoned mines. SMCRA also initiated an abandoned mine land fund, in which a fee was charged for each ton of coal produced. This revenue was distributed in part to the United Mine Workers Association (UMWA) towards retirement funds, as well as to the Office of Surface Mining Reclamation and Enforcement (OSMRE) to continue operations. There is still around $2 billion in undistributed funds thus far.

Abandoned Mines in Canada

Definitions 

 National Orphaned/Abandoned Mines Initiative - Orphaned or abandoned mines are those mines for which the owner cannot be found or,  the owner is financially unable or unwilling to carry out clean-up. They pose environmental, health, safety, and economic problems to communities, the mining industry, and governments in many countries, including Canada.
The Ontario Mining Act describes "abandoned mines" as old land previously used for coal mining unused due to hazardous environmental and health effects.

There are approximately 10,139 abandoned mines currently in Canada. Research is being done to utilize geothermal systems in these abandoned mines as a renewable heating source and has shown to be quite cost-efficient.

Reuse of abandoned mines 
Abandoned mines may be reused for other purposes, such as pumped-storage hydropower.

See also 
 RECLAIM Act

References

External links 
 
 Abandonedmines.gov- United States Federal Mining Dialogue Workgroup web portal
 Abandoned Mine Lands- Department of the Interior - Bureau of Land Management
 Abandoned Mineral Lands - Department of the Interior - National Park Service
 Abandoned Mine Lands - Department of Agriculture - United States Forest Service
 Stay Out - Stay Alive - Department of Labor - Office of Mine Safety and Health Administration 
 National Orphaned Mine Initiative - Canada - National multi-stakeholder Workgroup

Mining in the United States